The prix RFO du livre was a French literary prize awarded annually from 1995 to 2010 by RFO to a Francophone work of fiction linked to French overseas departments and territories or surrounding geographical and geopolitical zones.

List of rewarded works 
1995: 
1996: 
1997: 
1998: 
1999: 
2000: 
2001: 
2002: 
2003: 
2004: 
2005: 
2006: 
2007: 
2008: 
2009: 
2010:

References

External links 
 Prix RFO du livre on the site of the Académie française
  Le Prix littéraire de France Ô remplace le Prix RFO du Livre on France-Antilles

French literary awards
Awards established in 1995
Awards disestablished in 2010
1995 establishments in France
2010 disestablishments in France